Air Horizons was an airline based in Paris, France. It operated charter flights for tour operators to the Mediterranean and Africa. Its main bases were Orly Airport, Paris, Charles de Gaulle Airport, Paris and Le Bourget Airport, Paris.

History
The airline was founded as Euralair in October 1962 by Alexandre Couvelaire. In November 2003 Euralair had to file for bankruptcy protection. Euralair Horizons and Euralair International were saved from liquidation by a last-minute takeover offer from UK-based Angel Gate Aviation and in February 2004 Euralair was restarted as Air Horizons.

In November 2005, however, the airline filed for bankruptcy protection in a French court.

Air Horizons ceased operations in November 2005.

Services
Air Horizons launched weekly scheduled services from Montpellier to Casablanca and from Charles de Gaulle Airport, Paris to Ouarzazate in October 2004.

Fleet
The former Air Horizons fleet was formed by Boeing 737-300, Boeing 737-400, Boeing 737-800 and Boeing 757-200.
All these planes were returned to their lessor after the airline closed December 7, 2005

References

External links

Defunct airlines of France
Airlines established in 2004
Airlines disestablished in 2005
Defunct charter airlines